Open: An Autobiography is a memoir written by former professional tennis player Andre Agassi with assistance from J. R. Moehringer published on November 9, 2009. Throughout the book, Agassi, an eight-time Grand Slam champion and former world No. 1, details his challenging childhood under the supervision of a demanding father and prolonged struggles with the physical and psychological tolls of professional tennis. Despite controversy surrounding Agassi's admission to using methamphetamine in 1997, the book reached No. 1 on the New York Times Best Seller list and was met with critical acclaim, with New York Times writer Sam Tanenhaus claiming that Open "is not just a first-rate sports memoir but a genuine bildungsroman, darkly funny yet also anguished and soulful".

Summary
A boy from a poor family conquering the big world and tennis: it has an aggressive father with a heavy hand, and a resigned mother who does not dare to stand up for her son, and round-the-clock training sessions hated by little Andre. Emotional stories from life, the meaning of which the rebel Agassi found only by meeting true love in the person of Steffi Graf, feeling the joy of fatherhood and learning to win for the sake of people who need his support.

Reception

See also
List of Grand Slam Men's Singles champions
List of ATP number 1 ranked singles tennis players

References

Sports autobiographies
Tennis books
2009 non-fiction books
2009 in tennis